Nonamesset Island is the most easterly of the Elizabeth Islands of Dukes County, Massachusetts, United States. The island has a land area of 1.398 km² (0.54 sq mi or 345.5 acres) and was uninhabited as of the 2000 census.  The island is part of the town of Gosnold, Massachusetts.

Painter Robert Swain Gifford was born on the island in 1840.

References

Elizabeth Islands
Uninhabited islands of Massachusetts
Coastal islands of Massachusetts